Into the Light is the first extended play by South Korean girl group Lightsum. The EP was released by Cube Entertainment on May 24, 2022, and contains five tracks, including the lead single "Alive". This was the final release to feature former members Huiyeon and Jian, before their departures from the group on October 25, 2022.

Background and release
On May 9, 2022, Cube Entertainment announced Lightsum would be releasing their first extended play titled Into the Light on May 24. A day later, the promotional schedule was released. On May 13, the track listing was released with "Alive" announced as the lead single. On May 19, a promotional video titled "Synergy" was released, followed by the release of an audio snippet video a day later. The music video teaser for "Alive" was released on May 22–23.

Commercial performance
Into the Light debuted at number 13 on South Korea's Gaon Album Chart in the chart issue dated May 22–28, 2022; on the monthly chart, the EP debuted at number 39 in the chart issue for May 2022 with 17,902 copies sold.

Promotion
Prior to the extended play's release, on May 24, 2022, Lightsum held a live event to introduce the EP and communicate with their fans.

Track listing

Charts

Weekly charts

Monthly charts

Sales

Release history

References

2022 EPs
Cube Entertainment EPs
Korean-language EPs